Lubomír Štrougal (19 October 1924 – 6 February 2023) was a Czech politician who was the prime minister of Czechoslovakia from 1970 to 1988.

Biography
Štrougal was born in Veselí nad Lužnicí on 19 October 1924. His father, a communist, died in a concentration camp during World War II. Štrougal studied law at Charles University in Prague. 

Štrougal joined the Communist Party of Czechoslovakia, and in the late 1950s became a member of its Central Committee. Štrougal was agriculture minister between 1959 and 1961, and then interior minister until 1965. In 1968, he became deputy prime minister under Oldřich Černík. At first he rejected the 1968 occupation of Czechoslovakia by Warsaw Pact forces, but later became a prominent figure in Gustáv Husák's regime. 

Štrougal became the prime minister of Czechoslovakia on 28 January 1970. In the 1980s, he supported perestroika, the reform process initiated by Soviet President Mikhail Gorbachev. He resigned as prime minister on 12 October 1988 due to conflicts with Communist Party chairman Miloš Jakeš, a hard-liner. Following the Velvet Revolution of 1989, Štrougal decided to retire from politics; he was ultimately expelled from the party in February 1990.

The Office for the Documentation and the Investigation of the Crimes of Communism Police of the Czech Republic (UDV) alleged that, in 1965, Štrougal had prevented investigation of crimes conducted by the communist State Security in the late 1940s. Štrougal was acquitted of the charge in July 2002. In 2022, Štrougal was again put on trial, along with former Interior Minister , for ordering the killing of citizens trying to cross the border into the west. However, experts from the psychiatric hospital where he was being treated said he was suffering from mild dementia and could not comprehend the court proceedings. Regardless, Štrougal claimed that the killings were not his responsibility.Štrougal died on 6 February 2023, at the age of 98.

References

External links

 Štrougal’s biography on the website of the Czech Government

1924 births
2023 deaths
People from Veselí nad Lužnicí
Members of the Central Committee of the Communist Party of Czechoslovakia
Prime Ministers of Czechoslovakia
Government ministers of Czechoslovakia
Agriculture ministers
Members of the National Assembly of Czechoslovakia (1960–1964)
Members of the National Assembly of Czechoslovakia (1964–1968)
Members of the Chamber of the People of Czechoslovakia (1969–1971)
Members of the Chamber of the People of Czechoslovakia (1971–1976)
Members of the Chamber of the People of Czechoslovakia (1976–1981)
Members of the Chamber of the People of Czechoslovakia (1981–1986)
Members of the Chamber of the People of Czechoslovakia (1986–1990)
Communist Party of Czechoslovakia prime ministers
Czech communists
People of the Velvet Revolution
Charles University alumni
Czechoslovak World War II forced labourers